March is the third month of the year.

March or marching may also refer to:

Marching
 Marching, the walking of military troops and such in procession according to a steady rhythm
 March, a parade or procession of people, animals, time, or objects
 Death march, a forced march of prisoners of war or other captives or deportees
 The March (1945), death march during the final months of the Second World War in Europe
 Demonstration (protest), if held in the form of a procession over a long distance
 March on Washington for Jobs and Freedom, a march that took place on August 28, 1963
 March for Life (Washington, D.C.), annual event that takes place in Washington, D.C.

Places
 March (territory) or "mark", border regions, of importance in the Medieval history of various countries
 March, Breisgau, a municipality in the rural district of Breisgau-Hochschwarzwald, Germany
 March, Cambridgeshire, a town in England
 March, Iran, a village in Mazandaran Province, Iran
 March, Minnesota, an unincorporated community in the United States
 March, Missouri, a community in the United States
 Earl of March, earldoms in England and Scotland
 March Air Reserve Base, a military base in Riverside, California named after Peyton C. March, Jr.
 March District, Switzerland
 Marches, Drôme, a commune in the Drôme department in France
 Welsh Marches, a region of the UK on and near the border between England and Wales
 Morava (river), German name March, a river in Central Europe, tributary of the Danube

People
March (surname), a surname (including a list of people and fictional characters with the surname)
March Avery (born 1932), American painter.
March Fong Eu (born 1922), American politician

Arts, entertainment and media

Films
 March of Time, a US short film series broadcast from 1931 to 1951
 March of the Wooden Soldiers, the US title of the film Babes in Toyland (1934)

Literature
 March (novel), a novel by Geraldine Brooks
 The March (novel), 2005 historical fiction novel by E. L. Doctorow

Music
 March (music), a genre of music associated with marching cadences
Funeral march, funeral music
 Wedding march, wedding music

Albums
 March (Lene Lovich album), an album by Lene Lovich
 March (Michael Penn album), an album by Michael Penn

Songs
 "March", by Avail from Satiate, 1992
 "March", by Basement from I Wish I Could Stay Here, 2011
 "March", by Cardiacs from Heaven Born and Ever Bright, 1992
 "March", by George Tandy Jr.
 "March", by North Sea Radio Orchestra from Leader of the Starry Skies: A Tribute to Tim Smith, Songbook 1, 2010
 "March", or "March of the Toy Soldiers", from The Nutcracker
 "Marching Song", a classical piece by Gustav Holst

Other uses in arts, entertainment, and media
 March (comics), a graphic novel trilogy about the Civil Rights Movement by U.S. Congressman John Lewis, Andrew Aydin, and Nate Powell
The Marches: Border Walks With My Father, 2016 book by British politician Rory Stewart

Brands and enterprises
 Banca March, Spanish bank
 March Engineering, a Formula One Team and racing car constructor
 March Entertainment, an animation production company
 Nissan March, a compact car

Organizations
 March of Dimes, a US nonprofit organization that works to improve the health of mothers and babies to prevent birth defects, premature birth, and infant mortality
 Medically Aware and Responsible Citizens of Hyderabad (MARCH)

Other uses
 Ides of March, March 15, an eventful day on the Roman calendar
 M.Arch., Master of Architecture, a professional degree in architecture
 March Madness (also known and branded as NCAA March Madness), NCAA Division I men's basketball tournament, a single-elimination tournament played each spring in the United States

See also
 Marcha (disambiguation)
 Marche (disambiguation)
 Marsch (disambiguation)
 The March (disambiguation)